It's Dangerous Beyond The Blankets is a South Korean variety show. The show features "homebodies", people who love to stay home doing nothing, going on a trip together.

The first season consisted of 3 pilot episodes, which were aired from August 27, 2017 to September 10, 2017.

The second season aired every Thursday at 23:10 (KST), from April 5, 2018 to July 12, 2018.

Cast

Season 1 (Pilot)

Season 2

Episodes

Season 1 (Pilot) 
The first season consists of 3 pilot episodes, starring Lee Sang-woo, Yong Jun-hyung of Highlight, singer Park Jae-jung, Kang Daniel of Wanna One, Xiumin of Exo, and singer Jo Jung-chi.

Season 2 
The second season of the show stars returning cast members Kang Daniel, Xiumin and Yong Jun-hyung, along with new cast members. The production staff stated, “We are looking for celebrity homebodies from all walks of life. These homebodies with different personalities will be grouped into units of four to six people, who will then go on a trip together.”

Ratings 

In the tables below,  represent the lowest ratings and  represent the highest ratings.

Season 1 (Pilot)

Season 2 

 Episode 9 was not aired on June 7, 2018 due to the broadcast of the Seoul mayoral debate for the 2018 local elections.
 The show went on hiatus from June 14, 2018 to July 5, 2018 due to the broadcast of the 2018 World Cup in Moscow, Russia.

Awards and nominations

References 

MBC TV television dramas
South Korean variety television shows
2018 South Korean television series debuts
2017 South Korean television series debuts